"I'm Alright" is a song written by Phil Vassar, and recorded by American country music singer Jo Dee Messina.  It was released in May 1998 as the second single and title track from her album of the same name. It became her second consecutive Number One hit on the Billboard country charts, spending three weeks at Number One. "I'm Alright" was certified 2x Platinum by the RIAA on September 4, 1998 alongside "Bye, Bye."

Phil Vassar, who wrote the song, covered the song on his 2006 Greatest Hits, Vol. 1 album, with some altered lyrics.

Content
The song is an up-tempo in the key of C major, featuring a piano and electric guitar backing with pedal steel guitar and Dobro flourishes. The lyrics centralize on the female narrator, who is conversing with a friend. She details the various events that are going on in her life, such as lacking money and missing friends and family, but still asserts that she "must be doin' alright".

Music video
The music video was directed by Jon Small and premiered in mid-1998.

Chart performance
"I'm Alright" debuted at number 59 on the U.S. Billboard Hot Country Singles & Tracks for the week of May 23, 1998. The song was a Number One country hit in both the U.S. and Canada and reached number 43 on the Billboard Hot 100.

Weekly charts

Year-end charts

Certifications

|}

Phil Vassar version

On his album Greatest Hits, Vol. 1, Vassar recorded his own version of the song with some altered lyrics. Unlike the original Jo Dee Messina recording, Vassar's rendition features an extended piano intro and slight lyrical changes.

References

1998 singles
1998 songs
Jo Dee Messina songs
Phil Vassar songs
Songs written by Phil Vassar
Song recordings produced by Byron Gallimore
Song recordings produced by Tim McGraw
Curb Records singles